Jose Mari C. Gonzalez or Jose Mari Gonzales (July 26, 1938 – April 16, 2019) was a Filipino actor, executive, matinee idol and politician.

Career
Gonzales entered the movies at the age of 17 in the late 1950s. He appeared in Ulilang Anghel (1958), Tawag Ng Tanghalan (1958), Mga Anghel Sa Lansangan (1959), Handsome (1959) and Baby Face (1959). He became a matinee idol in Sampaguita Pictures in movies such as Beatnik (1960) with Susan Roces, Joey, Eddie, Lito (1961) with Eddie Gutiérrez and Lito Legaspi, Operatang Sampay Bakod (1961) with Amalia Fuentes and Dolphy, Tindahan Ni Aling Epang (1961) with Liberty Ilagan, Kaming Mga Talyada (1962) where he played gay roles together with Juancho Gutiérrez, Dindo Fernando and Barbara Pérez among others.

In the 1960s, he was paired with Liberty Ilagan as a "loveteam" in Sampaguita Pictures movies. Larry Santiago Productions continued their team-up in the 1966 picture Dearest One.

In 1971, Gonzales was elected the first president of the Philippine Association of the Record Industry (PARI).

Gonzales produced the first single "Enveloped Ideas" of The Dawn in 1987.

In 2005, Gonzales was inducted in the Eastwood City Walk of Fame in Eastwood City, Quezon City.

Personal life
Gonzales was born in Manila. He studied at De La Salle College in Manila, majoring in Electronics and Communication Engineering.

He was married to Charito Malarky, a former model of Spanish and British ancestry. Their paths first crossed when she was twelve and he, seventeen. He was the father of actresses Cristina Gonzales (wife of Mayor Alfred Romualdez) and Ana Margarita Gonzales.

During the term of President Cory Aquino, Gonzales was appointed director of the Bureau of Broadcast Services and in 1994, made head of state-owned television station RPN 9. As a TV executive, he adapted the telenovelas Marimar and La Traidora, dubbed in Tagalog, for the Philippine audience.

In 1998, he ran for Congress as an independent candidate and won in San Juan, Metro Manila.  On November 13, 2000, Gonzales was involved in a slapping incident of retired general Bayani Fabic, Sergeant-at-Arms of the House of Representatives, which had impeached President Joseph Estrada. For the misdeed and after a lengthy court trial, the Quezon City Metropolitan Trial Court found Gonzales guilty on criminal charges of grave slander by deed.

Selected filmography
1968 Operation: Discotheque 
1966 Viva Ranchera
1965 Ana Roberta
1965 Maria Cecilia
1964 Show Business
1964 Let's Go
1964 The Nite Owl
1963 Ako'y Ibigin Mo, Dalagang Matapang
1963 King and Queen for a Day
1963 Amaliang Mali-Mali vs. Susanang Daldal
1963 Dance O-Rama
1962 Barilan Sa Baboy Kural
1962 The Big Broadcast
1962 Kaming mga Talyada
1962 Pitong Kalbaryo ni Inang
1961 Joey, Eddie, Lito
1960 7 Amores
1960 Amy, Susie, & Tessie
1960 Laura
1959 Baby Face
1959 Handsome
1958 Tawag ng Tanghalan
1958 Ulilang Angel

See also
Legislative district of San Juan, Metro Manila

References

External links
Jose Mari Gonzales at www.josemarigonzales.com/Publicity.htm

1938 births
2019 deaths
Filipino actor-politicians
21st-century Filipino businesspeople
20th-century Filipino politicians
Filipino people of Spanish descent
Male actors from Leyte (province)
Members of the House of Representatives of the Philippines from San Juan, Metro Manila
Radio Philippines Network people
20th-century Filipino male actors
People from Tacloban
21st-century Filipino politicians
Deaths from pneumonia in the Philippines